Plaza Towers East  is the tallest building in Iowa City, Iowa, United States. Construction on the 14-story Condominium/hotel building began in 2003 and it was completed two years later. The 13-story west tower was completed at the same time. The Modern Movement structure was designed by Neumann Monson Architects of Iowa City. McComas-Lacina Construction L.C., also of Iowa City, was responsible for its construction. The first three floors of both towers house commercial space, an extended-stay hotel is located on floors four to six, and three floors of apartments. The top floors are condominiums with penthouse-type units.

References

Residential buildings completed in 2005
Apartment buildings in Iowa City, Iowa
Residential skyscrapers in Iowa
Modernist architecture in Iowa
2005 establishments in Iowa